C42 is a secondary route in Namibia that runs from Grootfontein, Otjozondjupa Region to Tsumeb, Oshikoto Region. 

The C42 serves as a link road between the B1 and the B8.

References 

Roads in Namibia